Sia La is a mountain pass situated on Saltoro Ridge, in Ladakh, India, some  north-northwest of map point NJ9842 which defined the end of the 1972 Line of Control between India and Pakistan as part of the Simla Agreement. Sia La sits near the Chinese border and immediately northwest of the upper part of the vast Siachen Glacier, connecting that glacier to the Pakistani-controlled Kondus Glacier and valley to the west.

Geopolitical issues

Sia La, as well as nearby passes Bilafond La and Gyong La, saw military action starting in 1984 during Operation Meghdoot, the first military action of the Siachen conflict, itself being part of larger conflict, the Kashmir conflict. All three passes are currently held by India; However, Pakistan controls a pass just to the west that overlooks Sia La. They call it Conway Saddle & Leghari OP.

See also 
 Near the AGPL (Actual Ground Position Line)
 NJ9842 LoC ends and AGPL begins
 Gyong La
 Chumik Glacier
 Saltoro Mountains
 Saltoro Kangri
 Ghent Kangri
 Bilafond La
 Indira Col, AGPL ends at LAC

 Borders
 Actual Ground Position Line (AGPL)
 India–Pakistan International Border {IB)
 Line of Control {LoC)
 Line of Actual Control (LAC)
 Sir Creek (SC)
 Borders of China
 Borders of India
 Borders of Pakistan

 Conflicts
 Kashmir conflict
 Siachen conflict
 Sino-Indian conflict
 List of disputed territories of China
 List of disputed territories of India
 List of disputed territories of Pakistan
 Northern Areas
 Trans-Karakoram Tract

 Operations
 Operation Meghdoot, by India
 Operation Rajiv, by India
 Operation Safed Sagar, by India

 Other related topics
 Awards and decorations of the Indian Armed Forces
 Bana Singh, after whom Quaid Post was renamed to Bana Top 
 Dafdar, westernmost town in Trans-Karakoram Tract
 India-China Border Roads
 List of extreme points of India
 Sino-Pakistan Agreement for transfer of Trans-Karakoram Tract to China

References

Citations

External links 
 Siachen Peace Park

Mountain passes of Ladakh
Mountain passes of India
Mountain passes of the Himalayas
Mountain passes of the Karakoram